Andrea Hübner (later Ehrlich, born 17 February 1957 in Karl-Marx-Stadt) is a retired German swimmer who won two gold medals at the 1973 World Aquatics Championships, breaking world records in the 200 m medley and 4 × 100 m freestyle relay events. She also won a gold and a silver medal at the 1974 European Aquatics Championships. She is a sister of the former professional track cyclist Michael Hübner.

References

1957 births
Living people
East German female swimmers
Sportspeople from Chemnitz
World Aquatics Championships medalists in swimming
European Aquatics Championships medalists in swimming